The Sanremo Music Festival 2011 was the 61st annual Sanremo Music Festival, held at the Teatro Ariston in Sanremo, province of Imperia, during the five nights between 15 February 2011 and 19 February 2011.
The artistic director of the show was Gianmarco Mazzi. Broadcast by Rai 1, the festival was presented by Gianni Morandi with Paolo Kessisoglu, Luca Bizzarri, Belén Rodríguez and Elisabetta Canalis.

The competition was divided in two sections. The "Big Artists Section", including 14 established Italian artists, was won by Roberto Vecchioni with the song "Chiamami ancora amore", while the "Newcomers Section" was won by Raphael Gualazzi, performing "Follia d'amore".

The festival also served as the national selection for the Eurovision Song Contest 2011. The Italian entry, Raphael Gualazzi, was chosen among the contestants by a specific jury, composed of TV presenter Gianni Morandi, Rai 1 director Mauro Mazza, Rai 2 director Massimo Liofredi, the mayor of Sanremo Maurizio Zoccarato, Sanremo's promotional board member Giorgio Giuffra and Marco Simeon, the director of international affairs.

Presenters and personnel

After some rumours emerged in September 2010, it was officially announced that Gianmarco Mazzi was confirmed as the artistic director of the Sanremo Music Festival. It was Mazzi's sixth Sanremo Music Festival as the artistic director. Italian singer Gianni Morandi was chosen as the main presenter of the show. Negotiations for his contract started in June 2010, and on 6 October 2010, RAI's board of directors confirmed his role in the show and announced Elisabetta Canalis, Belén Rodríguez, Luca Bizzarri and Paolo Kessisoglu as co-presenters of the festival.

The authors of the show were Simona Ercolani, Martino Clericetti, Ivano Balduini, Francesco Valitutti, Michele Ferrari, Gianni Morandi and Italian film director and writer Federico Moccia.

The Sanremo Festival Orchestra was conducted by Marco Sabiu, but each contestant chose a different conductor for the competing song. For the first time in the history of the Sanremo Music Festival, two choreographers were involved in the show, Daniel Ezralow and Franco Miseria. Duccio Forzano directed the show, and the scenography was by Gaetano Castelli and Maria Chiara Castelli.

Selections

Newcomers section

AreaSanremo
The artists competing in the newcomers section were selected through two different contests. The first one, formerly known as SanremoLab, was called Area Sanremo, and it was organized by the Comune di Sanremo. The contest was divided into two different sections, SanremoLab, featuring Italian-language songs, and SanremoDoc, reserved to songs in an Italian dialect. After some courses and lectures, two different juries chose 8 artists in the SanremoLab section and 2 artists in the SanremoDoc section as the winners. The jury for the SanremoLab section was composed of Mario Lavezzi, Roy Paci, Eleonoire Casalegno and Mariano Dapori, while the jury for the SanremoDoc section included Maurizio Coruzzi, Davide Van De Sfroos, Giordano Sangiorgi and Enrico Giovannini. The winners—Ida Massaro, Lorenzo Vizzini, Roberto Amadé, Erika Mineo, Eleonora Crupi, Ernesto De Luca, Martino Iacchetti and Gabriella Ferrone for the SanremoLab section, Trenincorsa and Ilaria Palmieri with Terre del sole for the SanremoDoc section—were announced on 24 November 2010. On 27 November 2010, a jury presided by Gianni Morandi selected two artists, Roberto Amadè and Gabriella Ferrone, among the ten winners, which became the first confirmed participants in the newcomers section of the Sanremo Music Festival 2011.

Sanremo Giovani 2011
The second contest held to select the remaining 6 participants in the newcomers section of the Sanremo Music Festival 2011 was held in two separate steps. During the first step, auditioning artists were asked to uploaded a video including the proposed song on the official website of the festival, or to send a DVD containing it by ordinary mail. The SanremoAcademy technical jury, presided by Gianni Morandi and Gianmarco Mazzi, selected nine artists. The artists chosen in this step were:
 Anansi, performing "Il sole dentro"
 Serena Abrami, performing "Lontano da tutto"
 BTwins, performing "Mi rubi l'amore"
 Raphael Gualazzi, performing "Follia d'amore"
 Infranti Muri, performing "Contro i giganti"
 Marco Menichini, performing "Tra tegole e cielo"
 Micaela, performing "Fuoco e cenere"
 Neks, performing "Occhi"
 Le Strisce, performing "Vieni a vivere a Napoli"
During the second step, the selected artists performed a popular Italian song during three different episodes of Domenica in, and a ranking was compiled based on televoting and on the points given by a jury representing Italian radio stations. The top 6 artists were admitted to the newcomers section of the Sanremo Music Festival 2011.

Plot 1 – 9 January 2011
 Anansi – "Hey man"
 Micaela – "Come il sole all'improvviso"
 Le Strisce – "Un diavolo in me"

Plot 2 – 16 January 2011
 BTwins – "Fotoromanza"
 Neks – "Aria"
 Infranti Muri – "Profumo"

Plot 3 – 23 January 2011
 Marco Menichini – "Se è vero che ci sei"
 Serena Abrami – "Se io, se lei"
 Raphael Gualazzi – "Quanto tempo e ancora"

The winners of the contest, Serena Abrami, Anansi, Btwins, Raphael Gualazzi, Marco Menichini and Micaela, were announced on 30 January 2011, during the TV programme Domenica in.

Big Artists section
The acts competing in the Big Artists section were chosen through an internal selection. The first confirmed artist was Roberto Vecchioni, announced on 5 November 2010. On 24 November 2010, it was confirmed that Franco Battiato and Luca Madonia were included as a duo in the official list of the participants. The complete list of the fourteen participants in the Big Artists section was revealed on 20 December 2010, together with the titles of the chosen songs. Alongside Vecchioni, and Madonia with Battiato, the list included Anna Oxa, Max Pezzali, Tricarico, Al Bano, Nathalie, Modà with Emma Marrone, Davide Van De Sfroos, Patty Pravo, Giusy Ferreri, Anna Tatangelo, La Crus and Luca Barbarossa with Raquel del Rosario.

Nights

First night

Big Artists section
During the first night, each act in the "Big Artists Section" performed a previously unreleased song. Each song was ranked by 300 people between the age of 18 and 65 years, selected by Ipsos among music listeners. At the end of the night, the two songs receiving the lowest points, Anna Tatangelo's "Bastardo" and "La mia anima d'uomo" by Anna Oxa, were eliminated from the competition.

Guests and other performances
 Antonella Clerici, who presented the Sanremo Music Festival 2010, opened the show. The Italian presenter told her experience in a dialogue with her three-year-old daughter, Maëlle, who was on the stage with her.
 Luca Bizzarri and Paolo Kessisoglu sang a satirical version of the song "In amore", originally performed by Gianni Morandi and Barbara Cola during the Sanremo Music Festival 1995. The comic duo's version of the song, "Ti sputtanerò", featured lyrics referring to the clashes between Silvio Berlusconi and Gianfranco Fini.
 Argentine tango dancer Miguel Ángel Zotto performed La cumparsita with co-presenter Belén Rodríguez, and danced with Daiana Guspero to the song Canaro en Paris.

Second night

Big Artists section
On 16 February 2011, each song was performed for a second time by the singers still in competition in the Big Artists Section. As in the first night, the songs were rated by 300 people chosen by Ipsos, and the songs receiving the lowest points, "Amanda è libera" by Al Bano and "Il vento e le rose" by Patty Pravo, were eliminated.

Newcomers section
At the end of the night, four artists in the newcomers section performed their entries for the first time. A ranking was obtained combining televoting with the points given by the Sanremo Festival Orchestra technical jury, and the artists in the bottom two slots, Anansi with "Il sole dentro" and Gabriella Ferrone singing "Un pezzo d'estate", were eliminated.

Guests and other performances
 During the show, Cuban American actor Andy García was interviewed by Gianni Morandi. He also played piano while Morandi sang "Cuba Libre" and co-presenters Belén Rodríguez and Elisabetta Canalis danced to the song.
 Luca Bizzarri and Paolo Kessisoglu performed a satirical piece, talking about Roberto Saviano, Michele Santoro and Luca Cordero di Montezemolo, among the others.
 British singer–songwriter Eliza Doolittle sang her hit single "Skinny Genes". After her performance, she was briefly interviewed by Gianni Morandi and Elisabetta Canalis.

Third night

Celebration of the anniversary of the Italian unification
On 17 February 2011, all the acts competing in the Big Artists section, including the eliminated ones, performed a cover of a popular Italian song, in order to celebrate the 150th anniversary of the Italian unification. During the night, the public's vote determined the winner of the prize "Nata per unire" (English: Born to unify), which was completely unrelated to the outcome of the contest. The song receiving the most votes was "Va, pensiero", performed by Al Bano.

Newcomers section
After all the Big Artists' performances, the four newcomers which didn't sing on the second night performed their entries for the first time. As in the previous night, the two artists receiving the lowest rating obtained combining the points given by the Sanremo Festival Orchestra technical jury and by the public's vote were eliminated.

Repechage round
In the end of the night, the four artists eliminated during the previous nights performed again their entries. The two acts receiving the most votes, Anna Tatangelo and Al Bano, were reinstated in the competition.

Guests and other performances
 Roberto Benigni, after entering the stage on the back of a horse, performed an exegesis of the Italian national anthem, "Il Canto degli Italiani". His long monologue included several references to current political events in Italy.
 Gianni Morandi performed the previously unreleased song "Rinascimento". Its lyrics, referring to the Italian unification, were written by Mogol, while the music was written by Italian singer-songwriter Gianni Bella some years before.
 Luca Bizzarri and Paolo Kessisoglu performed Giorgio Gaber's "Noi due stupidi", as a tribute to the popular Italian singer-songwriter.

Fourth night

Big Artists section
During the fourth night, the twelve remaining artists in the Big Artists section performed their entries in a new version, together with guest artists. Each song was ranked by the Sanremo Festival Orchestra technical jury and the results were combined with televoting. The two songs in the bottom two slots were eliminated.

Newcomers section

In the end of the night, the four newcomers still in competition performed their entries for a second time, and the winner was determined by combining the public's vote with the ratings given by the Sanremo Festival Orchestra technical jury.

Guests and other performances
 Monica Bellucci and Robert De Niro were interviewed by Gianni Morandi, promoting the film Manuale d'amore 3, directed by Giovanni Veronesi. De Niro was later interviewed a second time by Elisabetta Canalis.
 British pop group Take That performed the single "The Flood". After their performance, Robbie Williams and Gary Barlow were briefly interviewed by Elisabetta Canalis and Belén Rodríguez.
 Luca Bizzarri and Paolo Kessisoglu performed a satiric version of Morandi's "Uno su mille", featuring lyrics about leadership problems in the Italian Democratic Party.

Fifth night

First round
During the final of the show, the ten remaining artists in the Big Artists section performed their entries, and were voted by the Sanremo Festival Orchestra technical jury and by the public, through televoting. Music journalist were asked to vote for one of the artists, who received the "Golden Share" and was allowed to gain four slots on the previous chart. The Golden Share was received by Roberto Vecchioni, who already was in the top three artists of the night.

Second round

In the end of the night, the top three artists performed their entries for the last time, and the winner was determined by televoting only.

Guests and other performances
 Belén Rodríguez performed the song "Tú", accompanied by her father Gustavo Rodriguez playing guitar.
 Elisabetta Canalis danced to Ciara's song "Like a Boy", with Italian dancer Valerio Pino.
 Luca Bizzarri and Paolo Kessisoglu performed the traditional Italian songs "Reginella" and "Ma se ghe penso", dueting with Massimo Ranieri.
 Canadian singer Avril Lavigne sang her single "What the Hell" and answered a few questions by presenter Gianni Morandi.
 Massimo Ranieri was interviewed by Gianni Morandi. During the interview, they performed together Ranieri's "L'amore è una cosa meravigliosa", Morandi's "La fisarmonica" and Domenico Modugno's "Nel blu dipinto di blu".
 Italian television presenter Milly Carlucci appeared on stage to promote the seventh series of Ballando con le stelle, while Italian actors Giulio Scarpati and Nino Frassica promoted the TV series Cugino & cugino.
 Orchestra conductor Marco Sabiu performed his composition "Sabiu n. 7".
 A few minutes before the announcement of the top three artists, Luca Bizzarri and Paolo Kessisoglu performed Cochi & Renato's "Finché c'è la salute".

Other awards

Critics Award "Mia Martini"

Big Artists section

Newcomers section

Press, Radio & TV Award

Big Artists section
 Winner: Roberto Vecchioni with "Chiamami ancora amore".

Newcomers section

Ratings

See also
 Italy in the Eurovision Song Contest 2011

Notes

Sanremo Music Festival by year
Eurovision Song Contest 2011
2011 in Italian music
2011 song contests
2011 in Italian television